Frieder is both a surname and a masculine given name, a variant of Friedrich. People with the name include:

Surname:
Armin Frieder (1911–1946), Slovak Neolog rabbi
Bill Frieder (1942), former basketball coach
Katalin Frieder (1915–1991), Hungarian pianist

Given name:
Frieder Bernius (1947), German conductor
Frieder Birzele (1940), German politician
Frieder Burda (1936–2019), German art collector
Frieder Gröger (1934–2018), German mycologist
Frieder Lippmann (1936), German politician
Frieder Nake (1938), German computer scientist
Frieder Weissmann (1893–1984), German conductor and composer
Frieder Zschoch (1932–2016), German musicologist

German masculine given names
Surnames from given names